Qiemo County as the official romanized name, also transliterated from Uyghur as Qarqan County, is a county under the administration of the Bayin'gholin Mongol Autonomous Prefecture in the Xinjiang Uyghur Autonomous Region of the People's Republic of China, bordering the Tibet Autonomous Region to the south. The county seat is at Qiemo Town.

Name 
"Qiemo (W-G: Ch'ieh-mo) 且末 = modern Cherchen or Charchan (Uyghur: Qarqan). There has been uncertainty about this name as Chavannes (1907), p. 156, and then Stein (1921a), Vol. I, 296 ff., gave an incorrect romanization for the first character. Chavannes, using the French EFEO romanization system, gave tsiu, and Stein used the Wade-Giles equivalent, chü. In fact, the character is correctly rendered k’ie in EFEO, ch’ieh in Wade-Giles and qie in pinyin. Nevertheless, there has never been any serious dispute about its identification with modern Cherchen."
It has been suggested that the name "Cherchen" may have been derived from Shanshan, the kingdom that once ruled the area. A number of different names have been used for the town, Lionel Giles has recorded the following names for Ruoqiang Town (with his Wade-Giles forms of the Chinese names converted to pinyin):
Jumo Han
Zuomo Song Yun
Jumo Jun [Sui]
Zhemotuona Xuanzang
Boxian Zhen [Tang, after A.D. 674]
Jurjān [Mīrzā Haidar, sixteenth century]
Charchan [modern name]

It was called Calmadana in Kharosthi documents found in the region.

History 

Several mummies were found in Cherchen including the Cherchen Man.

The modern county is based on the ancient kingdom of Qiemo mentioned in the Hanshu and the Hou Hanshu. According to the Hanshu, Qiemo/Cherchen had "230 households, 1,610 individuals and 320 persons able to bear arms."

The ancient Qiemo may have been located on the east of the Cherchen (Charchan / Qarqan) river, across from the modern Cherchen. Qiemo became part of Loulan Kingdom after it was under Chinese control during the Han dynasty and renamed Shanshan. Later in 442 CE, after an attack by Juqu Anzhou, King Bilong of Shanshan fled to Qiemo together with half of his countrymen so Shanshan came to be ruled by Qiemo.

The Buddhist pilgrim Xuanzang passed through this region in 644 on his return from India to China, visited a town called Nafubo (thought to be Charklik) of Krořän (Loulan), and wrote of Ziemo (Qiemo), "A fortress exists, but not a trace of man".

Marco Polo who passed through Cherchen mentioned it as a province with a town of the same name as its chief city.  Its inhabitants were described as Muslims.

In August 2014, local authorities in Cherchen County (Qiemo County) announced, "Incentive Measures Encouraging Uighur-Chinese Intermarriage," including a 10,000 CNY (1,450 USD) cash reward per annum for the first five years to such intermarried couples as well as preferential treatment in employment and housing plus free education for the couples, their parents and offspring. County CCP Secretary Zhu Xin remarked:

Geography 

From the south to the north, the lands of the county run from the main range  of the Kunlun Mountains (which forms the border with the Tibet Autonomous Region) to the middle of the Taklamakan Desert. The southernmost area of the county includes the northern side of part of the Ulugh Muztagh range (the main range of the Kunlun), and a section of the Altyn-Tagh range which runs roughly parallel to the main range of the Kunlun. Most of the county population lives in the northern  foothills of the mountains, in the oases watered by snow-fed rivers.

The Qiemo River (Qarqan River) near the town of Ziemo (Qiemo) is frozen for two to three months in the winter. From the foot of the mountains to the oasis of Ziemo (Qiemo), it has a faIl of nearly 4000 feet.

Climate
Typically for Xinjiang, Qiemo has a harsh cool arid climate (Köppen BWk). Summer days are hot, although nights are fairly pleasant, whilst winters are chilly although less severe than in more northerly parts of Xinjiang, with average maxima above freezing except in January.

Administrative divisions
Qiemo (Qarqan) County includes five towns, eight townships and other areas:

Towns (镇)
Qiemo Town (Qarqan) ( / چەرچەن بازىرى)
Oyyaylak (formerly  / ئوييايلاق بازىرى)
Tazhong ( / تارىم ئوتتۇرا بازىرى)

Townships (乡)
Qiongkule Township ( / چوڭكۆل يېزىسى)
Tograklik Township ( / توغراقلىق يېزىسى)
Bagerik Township (Bage'airike;  / باغئېرىق يېزىسى)
Yengiostang Township (Yingwusitang;  / يېڭىئۆستەڭ يېزىسى)
Ak Tikandong Township (Aketikandun;  / ئاق تېكەندۆڭ يېزىسى)
Koxsatma Township (Kuoshisatema;  / قوشساتما يېزىسى)
Koramlik Township (Kula Muleke, Ku-la-mu-le-k'o;  / قوراملىق يېزىسى)

Others
Bingtuan 37th Regiment (兵团三十七团 / 37-تۇەن مەيدانى)
Bingtuan 38th Regiment (兵团三十八团 / 38-تۇەن مەيدانى)

Economy 
The economy of the county is primarily based on agriculture and animal husbandry. Agricultural products of the county include wheat, corn, cotton and rapeseed. Lynx and fox hunting in the county produces valuable animal skins. Mining in the county includes coal, jade and asbestos. Industries in the county include mining, leather making, and grain and oil processing.

Demographics
As of 2015, 50,754 (73.06%) of the 69,464 residents of the county were Uyghur, 18,365 (26.44%) were Han Chinese and 345 were from other ethnic groups.

As of 1999, 77.5% of the population of the county was Uyghur and 22.31% of the population was Han Chinese.

Transportation 
 Qiemo Yudu Airport
 China National Highway 315

Notable persons 
 Mihrigul Tursun, Xinjiang re-education camp detainee
 Cherchen Man, one of the Tarim mummies

Historical maps

Notes

References 

 Giles, Lionel (1930–1932). "A Chinese Geographical Text of the Ninth Century." BSOS VI, pp. 825–846.
 Hill, John E. (2015). Through the Jade Gate - China to Rome: A Study of the Silk Routes 1st to 2nd Centuries CE. Second Edition. Vols. I-II. CreateSpace. North Charleston, South Carolina.

External links 
 
 A tourism guide to Cherchen / Qiemo
 Tourism helps ancient Xinjiang village shake off poverty (tourism in Kulamulak)

County-level divisions of Xinjiang
Populated places along the Silk Road
Bayingolin Mongol Autonomous Prefecture